The Bavarian Class R 3/3 of the Royal Bavarian State Railways (Königlich Bayerische Staatsbahn) was an  intended for goods trains. Of the engines delivered before World War I, one went to the Polish  PKP, the other 17 were included by the Deutsche Reichsbahn as Class 89.7 in their numbering plan. The 90 units of the second series that were supplied from 1921 onwards all went into the Reichsbahn, and were designated as Class 89.8. 86 examples went into the Deutsche Bundesbahn after the Second World War and the last one was not taken out of service until 1960.

Numbers 89 835, 837 and 851 remained in Austria after the Second World War. The Austrian Federal Railway (Österreichische Bundesbahn or ÖBB) took them over as ÖBB Class 789 and designated them using their previous serial numbers. Numbers 789.835 and 837 were sold in 1956 as industrial locos, number 789.851 was retired in 1957. Finally number 789.837 returned to Bavaria and may be found today in the collection of the Bavarian Railway Museum (Bayerisches Eisenbahnmuseum) in Nördlingen.

No. 89 801 (ex K.Bay.Sts.B. 4701) belongs to the DB Museum fleet. It was damaged during the great fire on 17 October 2005 at Nuremberg and is being restored in Koblenz. (See photograph left).

See also 
 Royal Bavarian State Railways 
 List of Bavarian locomotives and railbuses

References

0-6-0T locomotives
R 3 3
Standard gauge locomotives of Germany
Krauss locomotives
Railway locomotives introduced in 1906
C n2t locomotives
Freight locomotives